Christian Kjellvander (born May 13, 1976) is a Swedish singer-songwriter.

History 
Before going solo, he played in the alt country band Loosegoats. They released three studio albums and one EP collection, before parting ways in 2001. In the summer of 2000, Christian along with some band mates and brother, Gustaf Kjellvander, recorded "The Painted Trees of Ghostwood" under the name Songs of Soil. 
After the breakup of Loosegoats, Christian decided to go solo and after spending July 2002 in a studio in southern Sweden, Songs From A Two-Room Chapel was released in the fall of the same year. The following 18 months Christian toured in Sweden and the rest of Scandinavia as well as Europe and a shorter US tour with The Cardigans.
In the summer of 2005, Christian returned to the studio with his band, Lazy Grace Frontier, to record the follow-up to the both critically and commercially successful solo debut. "Drunken Hands" was the first single from Christian's second solo effort Faya, released in late 2005. Kjellvander spent 2006 touring both with Lazy Grace Frontier and alone in Scandinavia and Europe.

In early 2007, it was announced on Christian's homepage that he would be supporting Logh on their European tour in April and May. During the summer of 2007, Kjellvander kept a low profile, only performing a few solo acoustic gigs, while recording his third solo effort at Mission Hall Studio. The working title of the album has been "I saw her from here, I saw here from her", which Kjellvander revealed on his MySpace blog. Several titles of potential tracks have been released, among them "Somewhere Else", "Two Souls", and "Until The Mourning Comes". The latter was recorded on a digital camera by Christian himself and released as a YouTube video by his record label Startracks at the end of July. In mid-October, "Two Souls" was released as the first, official single from Kjellvander's third solo effort. The song can be found on Christian's MySpace page and on YouTube with the official video. Additionally, Kjellvander's booking agent, Luger, has released several new press photos.

Discography

With Loosegoats
 Small Lesbian Baseball Players (EP, 1995)
 Mule Habit (EP, 1996)
 Country Crock (EP, 1996)
 For Sale By Owner (1997)
 A Mexican Car in the Southern Field (EP-collection, 1997)
 Disdialogic (EP, 1997)
 Plains, Plateaus and Mountains. Rivers, Lakes and Seas. (1999)
 Her, the City, Et Al. (2001)
 Ideas For To Travel Down Death's Merry Road. (2012)

With Songs of Soil
 The Painted Trees of Ghostwood (2000)

Solo albums
 Songs From a Two-Room Chapel (2002)
 Introducing the Past (2003)
 Faya (2005)
 I Saw Her From Here, I Saw Here From Her (2007)
 The Rough And Rynge (2010)
 The Pitcher (2013)
 A Village: Natural Light (2016)
 Wild Hxmans (2018)
 About Love And Loving Again (2020)

Other contributions
Acoustic 07 (2007, V2 Records) – "Drunken Hands"

Equipment

Fender Jazzmaster 66'(lake placid blue)
Fender Jazzmaster 59' (Sunburst)
Gibson SG 63'(Les Paul Custom)
Fender Stratocaster 64(Sunburst)
Gibson Les Paul 52' 57' (Gold Top)
Hermans Conde 78' (Media Luna Negra de Faustino Conde)
Martin 000 (nylon string)
Gibson ES 225 57' (Sunburst with Bigsby)

References

External links
Official website

Swedish male singer-songwriters
Swedish singer-songwriters
1976 births
Living people
21st-century Swedish singers
Tapete Records artists
21st-century Swedish male singers